Turbid Lake is a lake in Park County, Wyoming, in the United States. Turbid Lake was so named on account of its muddy water.

The lake is believed to have formed in the crater of a hydrothermal explosion some time around 1300 BC, which created a  crater, the floor of which eventually filled up to form the lake.

References

Bodies of water of Park County, Wyoming
Lakes of Wyoming